Poor Devil (Spanish:Pobre diablo) is a 1940 Mexican comedy drama film directed by José Benavides hijo. It stars Fernando Soler.

Cast
Fernando Soler
Pedro Armendáriz 			
José Escanero 	
Conchita Gentil Arcos 	 		
Raúl Guerrero	
Agustín Isunza 			
Tito Novaro			
Carlos Orellana 	
Manuel Pozos 	
Humberto Rodríguez 			
Manolita Saval		
Consuelo Segarra		
Virginia Serret 		 		
Arturo Soto Rangel 			
Paz Villegas

External links
 

1940 films
1940 comedy-drama films
1940s Spanish-language films
Mexican comedy-drama films
Mexican black-and-white films
1940s Mexican films